Phytoliriomyza melampyga is a species of fly in the family Agromyzidae. It is found in the Palearctic. Mesonotum with yellow bands. Scutellum yellow. Frons yellow. The larva mines Himalayan balsam (Impatiens glandulifera).

References

External links
Images representing  Phytoliriomyza melampyga  at BOLD
Leaf mines

Agromyzidae
Diptera of Europe
Insects described in 1869
Leaf miners
Taxa named by Hermann Loew